Lorenzo Benn (September 11, 1933 – June 2, 1990) was an American politician. He served as a Democratic member for the 38th district of the Georgia House of Representatives.

Life and career
Benn was born in Fulton County, Georgia, the son of Lilla Merriweather and Legree Benn. He attended Long Island University, the University of Pennsylvania, the University of Iowa and Atlanta Law School.

In 1981, Benn was elected to represent the 38th district of the Georgia House of Representatives. He served until his death.

Benn died in June 1990 of cancer at his home, at the age of 56.

References 

1933 births
1990 deaths
People from Fulton County, Georgia
Democratic Party members of the Georgia House of Representatives
20th-century American politicians
20th-century African-American politicians
African-American men in politics
Long Island University alumni
University of Pennsylvania alumni
University of Iowa alumni
Atlanta Law School alumni
Deaths from cancer